During the implementation of the Congress of Berlin, when the Principality of Montenegro had received Plav and Gusinje (along with other places), the surrounding Albanian populace under the guise of the Ottomans attacked the Montenegrin forces in Velika at two occasions, on October 9 and November 22, 1879. The Ottomans were defeated.

Background 
According to the decisions of Berlin Congress the territories of Plav and Gusinje (then Scutari Vilayet of the Ottoman Empire) were awarded to Montenegro. Still, the Ottomans did not provide conditions for Montenegro to take over Plav and Gusinje. Officially, they intended to respect the decisions of the congress, but in reality the Ottomans supported the League of Prizren they established, also to avoid fulfilment of the obligations they undertook at the Berlin Congress. The Ottoman governor of Scutari sent ammunition to the local Muslim population of Gusinje in order for them to resist Montenegro.

Prelude
Until October 1879, Montenegrin forces were able to march into Gusinje without resistance. When Montenegro prepared forces for such expedition, the Ottomans intervened at the Great Powers to stop it, under the excuse of avoiding eventual conflicts. The Ottoman military officer Muhtar Pasha arrived at Prizren in November 1879, where he had 15 battalions. The Ottomans informed Montenegro that those forces would only be used to provide the peaceful transfer of Plav and Gusinje to Montenegro, which demobilized some of its forces based on this information. In the meantime around 15,000 Albanian irregulars gathered in Gusinje. The British Ambassador at Istanbul A. H. Layard informed his government that the Porte did nothing to prevent the influx of armed bands into the Gusinje region and emphasized that the Porte would be held responsible for the consequences.

Milovan Đilas emphasized that the northern Albanian tribes had territorial aspirations toward the fertile plain along the river Lim in Plav and Gusinje. After the Berlin Congress, their aim was to descend into the valley before the official institutions of Montenegro grasped firm control over it.

Aftermath

Battle of Novšiće

Battle of Murino

The battle at Murino occurred about a month later after the battle of Novšiće (December 4, 1879) as the Ottoman high command was preparing to send troops from Monastir under Ahmed Muhtar Pasha in order to pacify local resistance to the annexation. The Montenegrin forces moved from Pepići against the positions in Meteh, near Plav when they were intercepted by the League of Prizren. After the skirmish, the Montenegrin forces withdrew to Sutjeska, near Andrijevica and Albanian irregulars burned down the Vasojevići settlements, Velika, Ržanica and Pepići. Both sides after the battle claimed victory.

References

Principality of Montenegro
Conflicts in 1879
Battles involving the Ottoman Empire
Battles involving Montenegro
19th-century military history of Montenegro
1879 in the Ottoman Empire
Scutari vilayet
Plav, Montenegro
Ottoman period in the history of Montenegro